Eric Christian Newman (born August 27, 1972) is an American baseball coach and former pitcher. He is the head baseball coach of the UC San Diego Tritons. Newman played college baseball at Fresno State before transferring to Texas Tech in 1994 and in Minor League Baseball (MiLB) for seven seasons from 1995 to 2002. He then served as the head coach of the Dallas Baptist Patriots (2005–2007)

Coaching career
Newman began to coach following the conclusion of his playing career. He joined the Dallas Baptist Patriots, under head coach Mike Bard as the team's pitching coach. During Newman's second season with the team, the ascended to NCAA Division I. In the fall of 2004, Newman was elevated to head coach of the Patriots. Newman lead the Patriots to a 95–72 record in his three years as head coach. On July 2, 2007, Newman was named the pitching coach of the Nebraska Cornhuskers.
On August 17, 2011, Newman was named the pitching coach at Cal State Northridge. Just 12 days later, Newman was named the head baseball coach of the UC San Diego Tritons.

Head coaching record

See also
 List of current NCAA Division I baseball coaches

References

External links

UC San Diego Tritons profile

1972 births
Living people
Fresno State Bulldogs baseball players
Texas Tech Red Raiders baseball players
Idaho Falls Braves players
Clinton LumberKings players
Rancho Cucamonga Quakes players
Mobile BayBears players
West Tennessee Diamond Jaxx players
Iowa Cubs players
Acereros de Monclova players
Sonoma County Crushers players
El Paso Diablos players
Vero Beach Dodgers players
Solano Steelheads players
Dallas Baptist Patriots baseball coaches
Nebraska Cornhuskers baseball coaches
UC San Diego Tritons baseball coaches
Dallas Baptist University alumni
People from Fremont, California
Baseball coaches from California